Ayingudi  is a village in the Arimalamrevenue block of Pudukkottai district, Tamil Nadu, India.

Demographics 

As per the 2001 census, Ayingudi had a total population of 855 with 434 males and 421 females. Out of the total population 526 people were literate.

References

Villages in Pudukkottai district